The Hong Kong Lacrosse Association is the governing body of lacrosse in Hong Kong. Founded in 1993, HKLA is a member Of World Lacrosse, Asia Pacific Lacrosse Union (APLU), as well as Sports Federation & Olympic Committee Hong Kong, China (SF&OC).

The representative teams organized by the association regularly participates in international and regional tournaments, both in Field lacrosse and Box Lacrosse.

International / Regional Events 
World Lacrosse Championship : The Hong Kong Men's Representative Team (HKMRT) has participated in the world ranking tournament since 2002, The WC is a once every 4 years event organized by FIL. The Men's Representative Team participated in the 2018 FIL World Lacrosse Championship at Israel in July 2018 and finished with 27th place out of 46 teams.

Women's Lacrosse World Cup : The Hong Kong Women's Representative Team (HKWRT) first participated in the world ranking tournament since 2013, The WC is a once every 4 years event organized by FIL. The Hong Kong Women's representative team is officially ranked 18th in the world. 

The Asia Pacific Lacrosse Championship (ASPAC): The only Asia bi-annual ranking tournament organized by APLU. Only National teams are invited and Hong Kong first participated in 2005.Currently, The Men and Women's Rep teams are at 4th place out of 8 & 6 teams respectively. 

U19 Championship: A once every four years’ event. Hong Kong participated in the U19 Championship for the first time in 2016 for boys and finished 11th out of 14 teams.

Greater China Cup (GCC) started in 2016 in order to promote Lacrosse among Hong Kong, Taiwan and midland China. Hence; the name Greater China Cup. The location of the tournament rotates among the three .

Local Events 
Leagues: 

HKLA runs five annual Men's and Women's league divided into different level from amateur to elite. League season starts on late Sept./early Oct every year and runs till early May. Presently, there are 6 men's club team and 3 women's club team competing for club trophy. 4 elite men team will battle for the premier league title. 2 men's team completing for the box lacrosse league title. 4 men's and 2 women's teams battling for the 7's league title. Starting 2017, HKLA is organizing a mixed league which is more of a social game rather than competitive as the objective is to build a Lacrosse community. 

Hong Kong Lacrosse Open

HKLA organize the Asia's most popular annual tournament for clubs and national teams in Asia since 2002. It attracts the most competitive teams in the region to fly to Hong Kong to participate. Hong Kong Lacrosse Open 2018 was held at Stanley Ho Sports Centre, University of Hong Kong and King's Park Sports Ground from 28 April to 1 May 2018. The tournament is the biggest lacrosse competition happened in Asia region. With 18 teams participating in both Men's and Women's Division, and the firstly held Youth's Lacrosse Festival in Hong Kong attracting 12 teams including 6 local schools and 6 inviting teams within Asian region dividing into U10 and U13 division.

Programs 
High Performance Program (HPP) is an elite program for HKLA development. Members participation is by invitation only and would have to go through series of tryouts. It is a 2 years’ program and members are expected to committed to intensive training programs and this is the major source of selection of the Hong Kong Representative team.

Development Academy: The program is designed to attract young players to engage in the sport and provide adequate activities to retain potential players. HKLA will provides regular training and coaching. This programme will serve as talent identification for the Hong Kong Lacrosse Under 19 Representative Team and the High Performance Programme (HPP).

References 

Lacrosse in Hong Kong
Lacrosse governing bodies in Asia
1993 establishments in Hong Kong
Sports governing bodies in Hong Kong
Sports organizations established in 1993